Archibald Hughes (1871–unknown) was a Scottish footballer who played in the Football League for Bolton Wanderers and Leicester Fosse.

References

1871 births
Date of death unknown
Scottish footballers
English Football League players
Association football defenders
Arthurlie F.C. players
Middlesbrough Ironopolis F.C. players
Bolton Wanderers F.C. players
Leicester City F.C. players
Glossop North End A.F.C. players
Chatham Town F.C. players
FA Cup Final players